C-L-A-W-S is the second studio album and first LP recorded by the indie rock band Gospel Claws.  It was released on October 26, 2010 by Common Wall Media.

Album information
Members of Gospel Claws that appear on this record are: Joel Marquard, Scott Hall, Wesley Hilsabeck, John Michael Mulhern, and Sloan Walters.  This album was produced and recorded at Flying Blanket Recording by Bob Hoag.  Departing from previous recordings where their music was tracked and then layered, this recording was done entirely live except for vocals and some ancillary instrumentation. Hoag also played the Glockenspiel, Organ (Hammond), and Tambourine, and lent some vocals to the final recording. It was mastered at the Blasting Room by Jason Livermore. Artwork was done by Chuckie Duff at Common Wall Media.

The album's name stemmed from front man Joel Marquard's devout and fervent spelling of the second half of the group's name during live performances to avoid being mistaken as “Gospel Clause.”

Reception

Critical reception

C-L-A-W-S received a mostly favorable reception.  Many critics praised Gospel Claws' upbeat album, calling it a "blend of gospel-and-surf-tinged indie pop, with some '50s style guitar licks," that creates a "remarkabl[y] complex indie pop."  At Phrequency.com, the critic declared that the album "is full of the type of slosh-y summer anthems that make you feel alive—from the pounding beat and stylish, CYHSY-style guitars of opener 'Walk me down' to the sing-song-y, campfire feel of 'Summer nights lakeside.'" After finding that C-L-A-W-S "initially may give the impression of a shallow and fleeting amusement" Travis Donovan at Death and Taxes found that "further visits reward the listener by revealing a deep reservoir of enduring redemption, wherein one finds a connection not only to their own childhood pleasures but the extolled imaginings of generations past." In the end, he qualified C-L-A-W-S as "one of the year's most unforgettable albums."

Ned Raggett's review at Allmusic.com was more lukewarm.  According to him, Gospel Claws' debut album "burst right out of the gate with a sound that is at once perfectly thrilling and perfectly obvious. Which sounds like damning with faint praise but there are no two ways around it."  Hesitant to rave about the LP, he concluded that "Gospel Claws may still move further along with their approach over time, but for now they're fated to be in the slipstream of those bands that they clearly love to death.

Commercial reception

C-L-A-W-S spent 5 weeks in the top 100 on CMJ Top 200 and 4 weeks on the FMQB Submodern charts with the album peaking at No. 2 and the single "Walk me Down" at No. 6.

Track listing

References

External links
 Gospel Claws
 Common Wall Media

2010 albums
Gospel Claws albums